Hamdiah Damanhuri is an Indonesian Olympic archer. She represented her country in the women's individual competition at the 2000 Summer Olympics. She came 15th place after both rounds, finishing with 637 points.

References

1973 births
Living people
Indonesian female archers
Olympic archers of Indonesia
Archers at the 1996 Summer Olympics
Archers at the 2000 Summer Olympics
20th-century Indonesian women
21st-century Indonesian women